Andy Obinna Young Ogide (born October 1, 1987) is an American-born Nigerian basketball player for OGM Ormanspor of the TBL. He attended the University of Mississippi before transferring to Colorado State University to graduate there. After college basketball, Ogide settled into pro basketball, where he currently plays with OGM Ormanspor in Turkey. He has also been a member of The Nigeria national basketball team and represented them in the 2016 Olympic Games in Rio. 

Ogide played in nine contests in the 2019-20 season with Assigeco Casalpusterlengo due to a knee injury. He signed with Cestistica San Severo on January 10, 2020. After averaging 18 points and 8 rebounds per game, Ogide re-signed with the team on July 5, 2020.

On July 1, 2021, he has signed with OGM Ormanspor of the TBL.

References

External links
French League profile
Colorado State bio

1987 births
Living people
American expatriate basketball people in France
American expatriate basketball people in Israel
American expatriate basketball people in Japan
American expatriate basketball people in Russia
American expatriate basketball people in Spain
American men's basketball players
American sportspeople of Nigerian descent
Bambitious Nara players
Basketball players at the 2016 Summer Olympics
Basketball players from Tallahassee, Florida
CB Breogán players
Club Ourense Baloncesto players
Colorado State Rams men's basketball players
Forwards (basketball)
Gipuzkoa Basket players
Liga ACB players
Nigerian expatriate basketball people in France
Nigerian expatriate basketball people in Israel
Nigerian expatriate basketball people in Japan
Nigerian expatriate basketball people in Russia
Nigerian expatriate basketball people in Spain
Nigerian men's basketball players
Ole Miss Rebels men's basketball players
Olympic basketball players of Nigeria